The canton of Saint-Galmier is a French former administrative division located in the department of Loire and the Rhône-Alpes region. It was disbanded following the French canton reorganisation which came into effect in March 2015. It consisted of 11 communes, which joined the new canton of Andrézieux-Bouthéon in 2015. It had 39,285 inhabitants (2012).

The canton comprised the following communes:

Andrézieux-Bouthéon
Aveizieux
Bellegarde-en-Forez
Chambœuf
Cuzieu
Montrond-les-Bains
Rivas
Saint-André-le-Puy
Saint-Bonnet-les-Oules
Saint-Galmier
Veauche

See also
Cantons of the Loire department

References

Former cantons of Loire (department)
2015 disestablishments in France
States and territories disestablished in 2015